Evelyn Florence Margaret Winifred Gardner (27 September 1903 – 11 March 1994) was the youngest child of Herbert Gardner, 1st Baron Burghclere, and the first wife of Evelyn Waugh. She was one of the Bright Young Things.

Early life
The Hon. Evelyn Florence Margaret Winifred Gardner was born on 27 September 1903 in London.  She was the youngest of four daughters born to Herbert Gardner, 1st Baron Burghclere, and Lady Winifred Anne Henrietta Christiana (née Herbert) Byng. Her mother was the widow of Captain Alfred John George Byng (a son of George Byng, 2nd Earl of Strafford) who died in 1887.  Among her sisters was Alathea, who married Sir Geoffrey Fry, 1st Baronet, and Mary, who married Geoffrey Hope-Morley, 2nd Baron Hollenden.

Her paternal grandparents were Alan Gardner, 3rd Baron Gardner, and his second wife, the professional actress Juliah Sarah (née Fortescue). Her father was born two years before his parents' marriage and was consequently not allowed to succeed in the barony of Gardner on his father's death in 1883 but was himself raised to the peerage as Baron Burghclere, of Walden in the County of Essex, in 1895.  Her maternal grandparents were Henry Herbert, 4th Earl of Carnarvon, and Lady Evelyn Stanhope, a daughter of George Stanhope, 6th Earl of Chesterfield.

Bright Young Things
In the 1920s she was one of the Bright Young Things, a nickname given by the tabloid press to a group of bohemian young aristocrats and socialites in 1920s London, and lived alone with Pansy Pakenham (one of the four daughters of Thomas Pakenham, 5th Earl of Longford). It was such an unusual arrangement that they were interviewed by Alec Waugh in the spring of 1927 for an article on modern girls. The two girls invited Alec to a party given in Portland Place by the Ranee of Sarawak, and he brought along his brother Evelyn Waugh. Before Waugh, Gardner had been engaged at least nine times, including to a soldier, a ship's purser, and a middle-aged divorcé. Harold Acton said she was "a fauness, with a little snub nose". Her closest friend, Nancy Mitford (daughter of the 2nd Baron Redesdale), said she was "a ravishing boy, a page".

Personal life
On 27 June 1928, at St Paul's in Portman Square, Evelyn Gardner married Evelyn Waugh, against the wishes of her father, who felt that Waugh lacked moral fibre and kept unsuitable company. Harold Acton was the best man, Robert Byron, the writer and art critic, gave away the bride, and Alec Waugh and Pansy Pakenham were the witnesses. Among their friends, they quickly became known as "He-Evelyn" and "She-Evelyn".  After only one year of marriage, she left Waugh for their mutual friend, John Heygate.

Second marriage
After the divorce from Waugh, of all their friends, only Anthony Powell remained in contact with Evelyn Gardner, despite the fact that most of them had been Gardner's friends before Waugh. It has been suggested that the adultress Brenda Last in A Handful of Dust (1934) is based upon Gardner. On 7 August 1930, Gardner married Heygate, a Northern Irish journalist and novelist. In 1936, this marriage also ended in divorce.  Four years after their divorce, he succeeded to the title of 4th Baronet Heygate.

Third marriage
In May 1937, she married Ronald Nightingale (d. 1977), a civil servant, later an estate agent. Together, they lived at Tunbridge Wells in Kent, had one son and one daughter, before separating:

 William Benedict Herbert Nightingale (b. 1939), a drama critic who married the American novelist Anne Bryan Redmon in 1964.
 Virginia Margaret Ann Nightingale (b. 1943), a landscape architect.

Gardner died on 11 March 1994 in Ticehurst, East Sussex and was buried in the graveyard of St Mary's Church, Ticehurst.

References

External links

 Evelyn Florence Margaret Winifred Nightingale (née Gardner, formerly Waugh) at the National Portrait Gallery, London.

1903 births
1994 deaths
English socialites
Daughters of barons
People from Ticehurst